Cts or CTS may refer to:

Arts and entertainment

Television 
 Chinese Television System, a Taiwanese broadcast television station, including:
 CTS Main Channel
 CTS Education and Culture
 CTS Recreation
 CTS News and Info (on Chunghwa Telecom MOD only)
 Christian Television System, in South Korea
 Crossroads Television System, in Canada
 The Catherine Tate Show, a British television program
 Channel 44 (Adelaide), in Australia, which uses the call-sign CTS33

Businesses
 Car Top Systems, a supplier of automotive convertible tops
 China Travel Service, the tourism and travel agency of China, parent company renamed China Tourism Group in 2020.
 Cognizant Technology Solutions, a US-based information technology services company
 Compagnie des Transports Strasbourgeois, a public transport company based in Strasbourg, France
 Connexxion Taxi Services, a division of Connexxion, a large public transport company in the Netherlands
 Colorado Time Systems, a US-based company providing aquatic timing services

Educational institutions

Seminaries
Chicago Theological Seminary, affiliated with the United Church of Christ, in Chicago, Illinois
Christian Theological Seminary, affiliated with the Disciples of Christ, in Indianapolis, Indiana
Concordia Theological Seminary, affiliated with the Missouri Synod of the Lutheran Church, in Fort Wayne, Indiana
Columbia Theological Seminary, affiliated with the Presbyterian Church, in Decatur, Georgia

Other educational institutions
College of Technological Sciences–Cebu, Cebu City, Philippines
The Calcutta Technical School, West Bengal, India

Science and technology

Computing and telecommunications
 Ciphertext stealing in cryptography
 Clear to send (disambiguation) control signal
 Common Type System, a common set of types in the .NET Framework
 Hermes Communications Technology Satellite, a Canadian communications satellite launched in 1976
 Computational transportation science, an interdisciplinary field addressing the modeling, planning, and economics of transportation

Medicine
 Carpal tunnel syndrome, a medical condition causing pain in parts of the hand
 Cracked tooth syndrome, a medical condition in which a posterior tooth has developed a crack
 Cubital tunnel syndrome, compression of the ulnar nerve at the elbow
 Cathepsin, a class of enzymes
 Cardiothoracic surgery, a field of medicine involved in surgical treatment of diseases affecting organs inside the thorax (chest)

Other uses in science and technology
 CTS (rocket stage), a Chinese solid-fuel upper stage
 Cadillac CTS, a luxury automobile made by Cadillac
 Conflict Tactics Scale, a social survey instrument for the study of conflict in relationships
 Copper Tube Size
 Cattle Tracing System, administered by the British Cattle Movement Service

Other uses
 Cambridge Tolkien Society
 Catholic Truth Society, an organisation that produces Catholic literature
 Certificate in Theological Studies (CTS) at Divine Word Seminary
 Combat Zones That See, a US defense project
 Consider the Source, New York City based jam band
 Cosmic Top Secret, the highest of four levels of NATO classified information
 Crack the Skye, an album by heavy metal band Mastodon
 New Chitose Airport (IATA code)
 Craftsman Truck Series, the former name of NASCAR Camping World Truck Series